The 1907 All-Ireland Senior Football Championship was the 21st staging of Ireland's premier Gaelic football knock-out competition. Dublin won their tenth All-Ireland title.

Format
The four provincial championships were played as usual; the four champions joined  in the All-Ireland championship.

Results

Connacht Senior Football Championship

Leinster Senior Football Championship  

An objection was made and a replay ordered.

An objection was made and a replay ordered.

Munster Senior Football Championship

Ulster Senior Football Championship

All-Ireland Senior Football Championship

Match unfinished; Cork were awarded the game.

Championship statistics

Miscellaneous

 It was the last year in the pre-2001 system expect for 1910 that there was Quarter-finals in the All Ireland series.
 Longford beat Westmeath in the prelim round in Leinster, but the game was awarded to Westmeath by the Leinster Council following an objection due to Longford playing 'a member of the militia' in their side. (Source: Westmeath Examiner, June 1907). However this game is referred to as a 'Second Division' game which is believed to be a reference to it being Leinster Junior Championship, not Leinster Senior Championship.

References